This is a list of awards and nominations received by Taiwanese actor and singer Show Lo.

Golden Bell Awards
The Golden Bell Awards are television production awards presented annually by the Government Information Office (GIO) of the Republic of China (Taiwan) and is Taiwan's equivalent to the Emmy Award.

Golden Melody Awards
The Golden Melody Awards are music production awards presented annually by the Government Information Office of the Republic of China (Taiwan) and is Taiwan's equivalent to the Grammy Awards.

Hong Kong TVB8 Awards
The Hong Kong TVB8 Awards are given annually by TVB8, since 1999, a Mandarin television network operated by Television Broadcasts Limited.

HITO Radio Music Awards
The HITO Radio Music Awards are given annually by HITO Radio, the parent company of Taiwanese radio station Hit FM. The order is not specified for the Top 10 Songs of the Year.

IFPI Hong Kong Album Sales Awards
The IFPI Hong Kong Album Sales Awards, formerly Gold Record Awards (金唱片頒獎典禮) is presented by the Hong Kong branch of International Federation of the Phonographic Industry (IFPI) since 1977. The order is not specified for the Top 10 Selling Mandarin Albums of the Year (十大銷量國語唱片獲獎).

Metro Radio Mandarin Music Awards
The Metro Radio Mandarin Music Awards are given annually since 2002, by Hong Kong radio station Metro Info. No order of ranking is specified for the Songs of the Year.

Metro Radio Hit Awards
The Metro Radio Hit Awards, like the Metro Radio Mandarin Music Awards, are given annually (usually in December) by Hong Kong radio station Metro Info. In contrast to the Mandarin Music Awards, the Hit Awards focuses on Cantopop music, and provide a few honours for Mandarin-language music.

Other awards

References

Lo, Show
Lists of awards received by Mandopop artist